Lawton is a surname. Notable people with the surname include:

 Alexander Lawton (1818–1896), division commander in the American Civil War
 April Lawton (1948–2006), musician and graphic designer
 Barbara Lawton (born 1951), American politician
 Ben Lawton (1922–1987), American surgeon and healthcare activist
 Charlwood Lawton (1660–1721), radical British lawyer turned Jacobite
 Edward Thaddeus Lawton (1913–1966), American-born Catholic bishop in Nigeria
 Sir Frederick Lawton (1911–2001), English judge
 Geoff Lawton (born 1954), Australian permaculturist
 Harold Lawton (1899–2005), British scholar
 Harry Lawton (1927–2005), American author and novelist
 Hattie Lawton (1837–?), American detective and Civil War spy
 Henry Ware Lawton (1843–1899), US Army officer
 J. F. Lawton (born 1960), American writer, producer and director
 James Lawton (1943–2018), British sports journalist
 Jimmy Lawton (born 1942), English footballer
 Sir John Lawton (born 1943), British scientist and chair of the Royal Commission on Environmental Pollution
 John Lawton (footballer) (1936–2017), English footballer
 John Lawton (musician) (1946–2021), British rock and roll singer
 Joseph Lawton (1857–1934), New Zealand cricketer
 Kayne Lawton (born 1989), Australian Rugby League player
 Lancelot Lawton (1880–1947), British historian, military officer, scholar of Ukrainian studies
 Larry Lawton (born 1961), American ex-con motivational speaker
 Linda Lawton FRSE, British researcher into cyanobacteria and water safety
 Matt Lawton (born 1971), American baseball player
 Russ Lawton, American drummer
 Scott Lawton (conductor) (born 1960), American conductor
 Stefanie Lawton (born 1980), Canadian curler
 Tommy Lawton (1919–1996), English footballer
 Captain Wilbur Lawton (1879–1917), pseudonym of author John Henry Goldfrap
 Will Lawton (born 1974), British musician

See also 

 Corinne Lawton Mackall (1880–1955), American painter, humanitarian, and gardener

See also 
 Laughton (disambiguation)

English-language surnames
Jewish surnames